Anton Ojala is a New Zealand diplomat. He is the New Zealand High Commissioner to Barbados.

References 

Living people
High Commissioners of New Zealand to Barbados
New Zealand diplomats
20th-century New Zealand politicians
Year of birth missing (living people)